William Lee was a ship's captain born in Austerfield, Yorkshire, England.

Time line
Birth March 15, 1741 Austerfield, England, United Kingdom
Baptism 8/24/1744   (Age: 3) Austerfield, England, United Kingdom
New York City August 21, 1768   (Age: 27) New York City, NY
October 1771   (Age: 30) Linville Creek, Augusta County, Province of Virginia Description: School Master
Fort Necessity March 1773   (Age: 32) Farmington, PA 15437 Description: Ohio River country to Fort Pitts
Pensacola, Florida, June 1774   (Age: 33), USA. Married, ran shipping business
Marriage 1774   (Age: 33) Pensacola, British West Florida to Charity
Residence October 1780   (Age: 39) Burke County, Georgia, USA. Farm 100 miles from Savannah
Birth of Charolette lee 7 August 1781   (Age: 40) Burke County, Georgia, USA. Bark Camp Creek, near Buck Head
Letters of Marque Oct 18, 1781   (Age: 40) Jamaica, Sailing on the Ship Molly captained by John Jordan
Captured by pirate Captain Kelly December 23, 1781   (Age: 40) Ireland. While serving on the ship Molley he was captured by the pirate ship Anti-Britton off Ireland
Rescued By Royal Navy HMS Stagg 23 Dec 1781   (Age: 40) Dublin S, Ireland, United Kingdom Description: Returned to visit his Mother
Military 1782   (Age: 41) ga. Jacksons legion Revolutionary War
Justice of Peace Richmond county GA 1785   (Age: 44) Richmond CO, GA
County Coroner, Richmond County Occupation 1792   (Age: 51) Richmond County, Georgia, USA
Death Of Charity Lee 8/28/1799   (Age: 58) Richmond county Georgia
memoirs that he wrote for his mother were published as a Book 1808   (Age: 67) published in UK. The true and interesting travels of William Lee

References 
The true and interesting travels of William Lee, by Lee, William Published in 1808, Printed for T. and R. Hughes (London)
Georgians in the Revolution: At Kettle Creek (Wilkes Co.) and Burke County Author: Robert Scott Davis
A History of Georgia Agriculture, 1732–1860 page 234 By James C Bonner
Through a Glass Darkly: Reflections on Personal Identity in Early America Page 168, By Ronald Hoffman, Mechal Sobel, Fredrika J. Teute
Coerced and free migration: global perspectives Page 403 By David Eltis
Perspectives on American English Page 32 By Joey Lee Dillard
A chronology of William Ball of St. Johns Parish Berkeley County, South Carolina and some of his descendants. LULU.com
Author: R C Ball,

Morningstars of Liberty:The Revolutionary War In Georgia,1775–1783, Four Volumes
Gordon Burns Smith, Boyd Publishing, Milledgeville, Georgia
A chronology of William Ball of St. Johns Parish Berkeley County, South Carolina and some of his descendants
Author: R C Ball,

External links 

PANTON, LESLIE & CO  http://homepages.rootsweb.ancestry.com/~cmamcrk4/crk3.html

Sea captains